Guadalupe Victoria (1786–1843) was the First President of Mexico and a general.

Guadalupe Victoria may also refer to:

Places
 Guadalupe Victoria, Baja California, Mexico
 Guadalupe Victoria, Ascensión Municipality, Chihuahua, Mexico
 Guadalupe Victoria Municipality, Durango, Mexico
 Ciudad Guadalupe Victoria, Durango, Mexico
 Guadalupe Victoria, Puebla, Mexico
 Guadalupe Victoria Municipality, Puebla, Mexico

Other uses
 Guadalupe Victoria (Mexibús), a BRT station in Ecatepec de Morelos, Mexico
 General Guadalupe Victoria International Airport, in Durango
 Guadalupe Victoria, a source of Mexican amber near Simojovel, Chiapas, Mexico